Avaí is a municipality in the state of São Paulo in Brazil. The population is 5,436 (2020 est.) in an area of 540 km².

References

Municipalities in São Paulo (state)